Jacob LeBlanc (born February 2, 1981 in Auburn, California) is an American retired professional soccer player.

Playing career 
LeBlanc decided to forgo his final year of college and sign with Major League Soccer in 2003.

Statistics

References

External links 
 Profile on MetroFanatic

1981 births
Living people
American soccer players
Soccer players from California
Association football midfielders
Virginia Cavaliers men's soccer players
New York Red Bulls players
Major League Soccer players
New York Red Bulls draft picks
People from Auburn, California